World War III (Persian: جنگ جهانی سوم, romanized: Jang-e jahāni-e sevvom) is a 2022 Iranian thriller drama film co-written, directed, produced and edited by Houman Seyyedi. The film stars Mohsen Tanabandeh, Mahsa Hejazi, Neda Jebraeili and Navid Nosrati. It was selected as the Iran entry for the Best International Feature Film at the 95th Academy Awards.

World War III competed for the Orizzonti Award at the 79th Venice International Film Festival where it won Orizzonti Award for Best Actor and Orizzonti Award for Best Film.

Premise 
Shakib (Mohsen Tanabandeh) is a homeless day laborer who lost his wife and son in an earthquake years ago. Over the last couple of years, he has been in a relationship with Ladan (Mahsa Hejazi), a deaf and mute prostitute. The construction site on which he works turns out to be the set of a film about the atrocities committed by Hitler during WWII. Against all odds, he is given a house and an opportunity of a lifetime. When Ladan learns about his movie role and the house, she comes to his workplace ask for help and a place. Shakib’s plan to hide her fails and threatens to destroy his chance to be somebody.

Cast 

 Mohsen Tanabandeh as Shakib
 Mahsa Hejazi as Ladan
 Neda Jebraeili
 Navid Nosrati as Nosrati
 Morteza Khanjani as Farshid
 Lotfollah Seyfi
 Hatem Mashmouli

Production

Pre-production 
On May 11, 2021, Seyyedi announced that he will not appear in Saeed Aghakhani and Ehsan Zalipour's The Secret of Survival (2022) series because he is involved in the production of his new film. On July 4, it was announced that the title of Seyyedi's new film will be World War III, and its pre-production has been started for a few days. Also, Mohsen Tanabandeh was introduced as the first actor of the film and some of the film's crew, and it was announced that the filming of World War III will begin in September, and it was said that the rest of the actors of the project were also announced in the next news. It was also announced that Namava Internet Broadcasting Service will invest in this project.

On September 4, it was announced that Seyyedi has obtained the license for the World War III project, and filming will begin soon.

Filming 
On October 27, 2021, the actors, writers and crew of the film were introduced and it was announced that the filming has started and is underway in the north of Iran. Some of the film crews have already collaborated with Seyyedi in the films Sheeple (2019) and Confessions of My Dangerous Mind (2015).

Release 
World War III (2022) was made with the investment of Namava, and it is the first time that the online streaming platform has entered into the production of a movie project, and it is also the second collaboration between Seyyedi and Namava after The Frog (2020–2021) series.

On August 4, 2022, it was announced that the film is set to compete for the Orizzonti Award at the 79th Venice International Film Festival.

Reception

Critical response 

— Screen Daily / Jonathan Holland

— The New Arab / Davide Abbatescianni

Accolades

See also
 List of submissions to the 95th Academy Awards for Best International Feature Film
 List of Iranian submissions for the Academy Award for Best International Feature Film

References

External links 
 

Iranian thriller films
2020s Persian-language films
2022 thriller films